Albert Leisenring Watson (December 6, 1876 – December 20, 1960) was a United States district judge of the United States District Court for the Middle District of Pennsylvania.

Early life

Watson was born in Montrose, Pennsylvania, on December 6, 1876. His father was Willoughby W. Watson, who practiced law for 50 years in Susquehanna County and Lackawanna County. His mother was Marie Kemmerer Watson.

Education and early career 
Watson received an Artium Baccalaureus degree from Amherst College in 1901 and read law in 1903 to enter the bar. He was in private practice in Scranton, Pennsylvania from 1903 to 1925. He was a Judge of the Court of Common Pleas for Lackawanna County, Pennsylvania from 1926 to 1928. He was also a trustee of the Scranton State Hospital and became president of the board in 1923.

Federal judicial service

Nomination 
On September 9, 1929, Watson was nominated by President Herbert Hoover to a new seat on the United States District Court for the Middle District of Pennsylvania created by 45 Stat. 1344. He was confirmed by the United States Senate on December 17, 1929, and received his commission the same day. He served as Chief Judge from 1948 to 1955, assuming senior status on May 31, 1955. He served in that capacity until his death on December 20, 1960.

Trial of the Scoblick brothers 
In January 1953, James P. Scoblick and two of his brothers were indicted in a check kiting scheme involving their fruit-processing business, Scoblick Bros. Inc. All three were convicted on December 3, 1954. Watson sentenced James Scoblick to 5 years in prison.

Personal life 
Watson married Effie Woodville in 1930. Together, they had two sons, Albert Jr., and Warren Woodville Watson. Watson died at 12:30 PM on December 20, 1960. Prior to his death, he had been a patient at the Mercy Hospital in Scranton since October 12.

References

Sources
 

1876 births
1960 deaths
People from Montrose, Pennsylvania
Amherst College alumni
Judges of the Pennsylvania Courts of Common Pleas
Judges of the United States District Court for the Middle District of Pennsylvania
United States district court judges appointed by Herbert Hoover
20th-century American judges
United States federal judges admitted to the practice of law by reading law